Pantesco is the Sicilian dialect of the island of Pantelleria between Sicily and Tunisia. It is notable among Romance varieties for an unusually high degree of influence from Arabic, reflecting a variety close to Maltese. Arabic loanwords, mainly nouns, include words such as hurrìhi "nettle" < ħurrayq (Maltese ħurrieq), vartàsa "hornless (goat)" < farṭās, hèddi "calm wind" < hādiʔ, as well as many place names around the island, including the name Pantelleria itself. In such loans, the glottal fricative h (unusual for a Romance dialect) is preserved as a reflex of Arabic laryngeals h/x/ħ and sometimes even q.

Pantesco uses unstressed subject pronoun clitics to form durative aspect.

A dialectal dictionary has been published (Tropea 1988).

References

Sicilian language
Italo-Dalmatian languages